Federal Administrative Court may refer to:

 Federal Administrative Court (Germany)
 Federal Administrative Court (Switzerland)

See also
 Administrative Appeals Tribunal of Australia